Danica Crnogorčević (born 1993) is a Montenegrin Serb singer of ethno and religious songs and a graduate art historian.

Her song "Veseli se, srpski rode" (Rejoice, Serb Kin), which was released on Vidovdan 2020, became an unofficial anthem and a symbol of the 2019–2020 clerical protests in Montenegro against President Milo Đukanović and his Democratic Party of Socialists (DPS).

Discography
 Album Gospode dođi (Lord Come) – released in 2018 with the help of the Ostrog Monastery:
 "Hristos se rodi" (Christ Is Born)
 "Svetom Vasiliju Ostroškom" (To Saint Basil of Ostrog)
 "Sveti Jovane Vladimire" (Saint Jovan Vladimir)
 "Zemljo moja" (My Country)
 "Sveti Nektarije Eginski" (Saint Nectarios of Aegina)
 "Doletio bjeli golub" (White Dove Flew)
 "Govori, Gospode" (Speak, Lord)
 "Εχε Γεια Παναγιά" (Farewell Panagia)
 "Svetome arhangelu Gavrilu" (To Saint Archangel Gabriel)
 "Bogorodice Djevo" (Virgin Mother of God)
 "Sini jarko sunce sa Kosova" (Shine Bright Sun from Kosovo)

Personal life
She is married to a Serbian Orthodox priest Ivan Crnogorčević with whom she has three children.

References

External links
 
 Official Channel on youtube.com

Living people
1993 births
People from Bar, Montenegro
Serbs of Montenegro
Members of the Serbian Orthodox Church
21st-century Montenegrin women singers